Mohammad Ismail Abdul Khalique is an Islamic scholar and an Indian politician from Malegaon city, Maharashtra. He had two terms as Member of the Maharashtra Legislative Assembly. He won from the Malegaon Central (Vidhan Sabha constituency). He first won in 2009 by Jan Surajya Shakti. In 2014, he joined Nationalist Congress Party and contested elections, but lost. In 2019, he joined AIMIM. He is also general secretary of Jamiate ulema-e-hind.

Positions held 
Maharashtra Legislative Assembly MLA
Terms in office: 2019–2024

Personal life
In 2020, a case was filed against Khalique for barging into a hospital in Malegaon with his supporters and manhandling doctor and hospital staff for not attending his calls. However, Ismail stated that he and his followers were polite and non-violent.

References

Jan Surajya Shakti politicians
Living people
Maharashtra MLAs 2019–2024
21st-century Indian Muslims
Marathi politicians
All India Majlis-e-Ittehadul Muslimeen politicians
People from Malegaon
Year of birth missing (living people)
Nationalist Congress Party politicians from Maharashtra